Another World is a 1937 French-German drama film directed by Marc Allégret and Alfred Stöger and starring Käthe Gold, Karl Ludwig Diehl and Franz Schafheitlin.

Shot at the Epinay Studios of Tobis Film in Paris, the film is the German-language version of Woman of Malacca. The film's sets were designed by the art directors Jacques Krauss and Alexandre Trauner.

Synopsis 
To escape her dreary life as a teacher, a young woman marries a British medical officer, who takes her to Malacca. The couple's disagreement increases and the young woman falls in love with a Malay prince.

Cast
 Käthe Gold as Audrey
 Karl Ludwig Diehl as Prinz Selim
 Franz Schafheitlin as Dr. Herbert Carter
 Herbert Hübner as Lord Brandmore
 Leopoldine Konstantin as Lady Brandmore
 Annemarie Steinsieck as Lady Lyndstone
 Karl Günther
 Alexander Engel as Dr. Jerrys, Arzt
 Karl Meixner as Li, Carters Diener
 Herbert Spalke as Sirdar, Adjutant Selims
 Margarete Kupfer as Mme. Turpin
 Maria Krahn as Mme. Tramon
 Melanie Horeschowsky as Mme. Tremons Schwester
 Andrews Engelmann as Ein Fremder
 F.W. Schröder-Schrom as 1. Journalist
 Kurt Meisel as 2. Journalist
 Jim Simmons as Kapitän Gerald Smith
 Ilka Thimm as Journalistin
 Richard Ludwig as Kapitän
 Erwin van Roy as Bordkommissar

References

Bibliography

External links 
 

1937 films
French drama films
Films of Nazi Germany
German drama films
1937 drama films
1930s German-language films
Films based on works by Francis de Croisset
Films directed by Marc Allégret
Films directed by Alfred Stöger
Films based on French novels
Films set in England
Films set in Malaysia
German multilingual films
Films shot at Epinay Studios
Tobis Film films
French black-and-white films
German black-and-white films
1937 multilingual films
1930s German films
1930s French films
German-language French films